John Gainsford (died 1543) was an English landowner and courtier.

He was the son of John Gainsford (died 1491) and Anne Worsley. His lands were at Hampton Poyle and Crowhurst Place. Some stained glass with his heraldry survived in the hall at Crowhurst, with the feather device of the Prince of Wales.

His great uncle, Nicholas Gaynesford, had been an usher to Elizabeth of York.

Gainsford was Sheriff of Surrey in 1500 and 1517.

He died in 1543 and was buried at Guildford.

Marriages and children
Gainsford married six times and had over twenty children. His wives were:
 Katherine Covert
 Anne Haut or Hawte, mother of Anne Gainsford who served Anne Boleyn
 Anne Fiennes
 Johanna Poliver
 Etheldreda or Audrey Shaw
 Grace Warham

References

1543 deaths
People from Surrey (before 1889)